Kevin O'Rourke (born January 25, 1956) is an American film, stage, and television actor, best known for his role as Scott Sherwood in Remember WENN (1996-1998), Edward Bader in Boardwalk Empire, and as Spencer Tracy in The Aviator.

Early life and education
Kevin O'Rourke was born January 25, 1956, in Portland, Oregon, and raised in Tacoma, Washington. He graduated from Williams College with a Bachelor of Arts degree in Theatre.

Career 
O'Rourke made his film debut in The Dark End of the Street (1981), and had supporting roles in Tattoo (1981) and Vice Versa (1988). From 1996 to 1998, he starred as Scott Sherwood on the series Remember WENN. After the conclusion of the series, he starred as Roy Mason in the television remake of Rear Window (1998). He also featured in one episode of The Sopranos''' first season as soccer coach Don Hauser.

In 2004, he had a minor role as Spencer Tracy in Martin Scorsese's The Aviator, and later appeared on the soap opera One Life to Live from Stan Lowell from 2008 to 2010. In 2010, he was cast as Edward L. Bader in the series Boardwalk Empire'', which earned him a Screen Actors Guild Award for Outstanding Performance by an Ensemble in a Drama Series.

O'Rourke founded the Williams College Summer Theatre Lab in 2005, serving as its artistic director for a decade.

Filmography

Film

Television

References

External links
 

1956 births
American male stage actors
Male actors from Portland, Oregon
Male actors from Tacoma, Washington
Williams College alumni
Living people